Minden is a city in Pottawattamie County, Iowa, United States. The population was 600 at the time of the 2020 census.  It has possessed a post office since 1875.

Geography
Minden is located at  (41.467002, -95.542231).

Demographics

2010 census
At the 2010 census there were 599 people, 232 households, and 165 families living in the city. The racial makeup of the city was 98.7% White, 0.2% African American, 0.2% Native American, 0.5% Asian, and 0.5% from two or more races. Hispanic or Latino of any race were 0.5%.

Of the 232 households 36.2% had children under the age of 18 living with them, 58.2% were married couples living together, 8.2% had a female householder with no husband/wife present, 4.7% had a male householder with no husband/wife present, and 28.9% were non-families. 25.0% of households were one person and 10.8% were one person aged 65 or older. The average household size was 2.58 and the average family size was 3.11.

The median age was 37.3 years. 27.4% of residents were under the age of 18; 6.6% were between the ages of 18 and 24; 27.3% were from 25 to 44; 24% were from 45 to 64; and 14.5% were 65 or older. The gender makeup of the city was 52.8% male and 47.2% female.

2000 census
At the 2000 census there were 564 people, 222 households, and 160 families living in the city. The racial makeup of the city was 99.82% White, 0.18% from other races. Hispanic or Latino of any race were 0.53%.

Of the 222 households 34.7% had children under the age of 18 living with them, 62.2% were married couples living together, 5.9% had a female householder with no husband present, and 27.9% were non-families. 23.0% of households were one person and 13.1% were one person aged 65 or older. The average household size was 2.54 and the average family size was 2.99.

The age distribution was 27.8% under the age of 18, 6.7% from 18 to 24, 27.8% from 25 to 44, 22.7% from 45 to 64, and 14.9% 65 or older. The median age was 36 years. For every 100 females, there were 95.2 males. For every 100 females age 18 and over, there were 95.7 males.

The median household income was $42,054 and the median family income  was $49,583. Males had a median income of $30,809 versus $22,813 for females. The per capita income for the city was $19,048. About 2.6% of families and 5.9% of the population were below the poverty line, including 6.4% of those under age 18 and 7.4% of those age 65 or over.

Education
Tri-Center Community School District operates schools serving Minden. Its high school is Tri-Center High School.

References

Cities in Iowa
Cities in Pottawattamie County, Iowa